Mid'hat Bey Frashëri (also known by his pen name as Lumo Skëndo; ; 25 March 1880 – 3 October 1949) was an Albanian diplomat, writer and politician. The son of Abdyl Frashëri, one of the most important activists of the Albanian National Awakening in 1908 he participated in the Congress of Monastir. In 1942 he became the president of Balli Kombëtar (National Front), an Albanian fascist collaborationist and anti-communist movement during the Second World War. Frashëri is referred to as one of the fathers of modern Albanian nationalism.

Biography

Early life
Mid'hat bey Frashëri was the son of prominent Albanian politician and statesman from 19th century Abdyl Frashëri (who initiated the movement of a wide autonomy from Ottoman Empire) and nephew of the poets and nationalists Naim Frashëri and Sami Frashëri. He was born in Yanya in the Ottoman Empire (present day Ioannina, Greece) in 1880 and was raised in Istanbul, where his family worked in the Ottoman administration and organised the Albanian nationalist movement. In 1897 Mid'hat Frashëri was arrested by Ottoman authorities for having a copy of the newspaper Albania, and was released after intervention by his uncle Sami Frashëri. During 1901, Mid'hat Frashëri published a biography on his uncle Naim Frashëri. Giving up his studies of pharmacology, he worked for the Ottoman administration in the vilayet of Salonika from 1905 to 1910. Frashëri published a yearly almanac Kalendari Kombiar (National Calendar) that was printed in Sofia and distributed in the Balkans from there. The publication held moderate positions were Frashëri  advocated for national unity, development of Albanian education, schools and literature and opposed foreign power intervention in Albanian affairs. Frashëri also called for government reforms an alliance with Macedonians to achieve those aims, but he was against armed resistance. Regarding the Albanian question and geopolitics, Frashëri was known in Albanian circles of the time to be anti-Austro-Hungarian and anti-Italian.

Using the pen name Lumo Skendo, he began publishing the weekly newspaper "Lirija" in Salonika, which lasted until 1910. While running Lirija, Midhat wrote an open letter to Ismail Qemali, expressing his strong disapproval of Qemali's policy of friendship with Greece.   

He participated in the Congress of Monastir in 1908, and in January of the next year, he began editing a monthly magazine entitled "Diturija", a magazine based on the cultural, literary and scholarly interest of Albania. In 1908, the Albanian club dealing with cultural and political issues was founded in Salonika and Frashëri was voted by 400 Albanian delegates as its president. Frashëri favoured the Salonika club being the headquarters of the Bashkimi (Union) Society however other Albanian clubs concerned about Young Turk influence in the city rejected that view and instead opted for the Monastir club. Ottoman authorities forbid writing in Albanian that resulted in publications being published abroad and like other writers of the time Frashëri used a pseudonym Mali Kokojka to bypass those restrictions for his works. By late 1911, Frashëri had joined the Freedom and Accord Party which was founded by him and ten others who were opponents of the Young Turks and advocated for Ottomanism, government decentralisation and the rights of ethnic minorities.

Congress of Monastir

Mid'hat Frashëri was one of the fifty delegates that who helped form the modern Albanian alphabet. He became vice-chairman of the commission. Frashëri was also elected chairman of the congress which was responsible for the organization of the various alphabet proposals along with Parashqevi Qiriazi who was chairwoman of the commission of the alphabet. During the alphabet congress Frashëri supported the adoption of the Latin character Istanbul alphabet for writing the Albanian language.

Albanian Declaration of Independence

Mid'hat bey's political views took on a nationalist character during the Balkan Wars and in the final collapse of the Ottoman Empire when Albania was on the verge of being carved up by its Balkan neighbours. Unlike some of his cousins who remained in what later became Turkey, Frashëri moved to Albania after the collapse of the Ottoman Empire. Mid'hat Frashëri was one of the eighty-three leaders meeting in Vlorë in November 1912. He was one of the signers of the declaration of independence and became the Minister of Public Works in the Provisional Government of Albania. He later became the Albanian consul general in Belgrade and postmaster general. At the beginning of World War I, Mid'hat was interned in Romania for a time, but after he was released, he returned to publishing. Mid'hat resided in Lausanne for a time with his cousin Mehdi Frashëri, where he was author of a number of newspaper articles and essays. On 25 November 1920, he was appointed chairman of the Albanian delegation to the Paris Peace Conference, where he remained until 1922. In Paris, he continued his journalistic activities in the French press to publicize Albania's position in the postwar restructuring of Europe. He subsequently held other ministerial posts and was Albanian ambassador to Greece and to the United States from 1922 to 1926.

Quiet period

Under the Zog regime in 1925, Mid'hat left public life and opened a bookstore in Tirana, and also worked as a pharmacist. He himself possessed an exceptionally large private library of some 20,000 volumes, the largest collection in the country at the time. With the rise of Germany and World War II looking inevitable, Mid'hat began forming Balli Kombëtar (the National Front) to use in the war to create Ethnic Albania.

Balli Kombëtar presidency

He was the leader of the Balli Kombëtar nationalist movement during the Second World War. Balli Kombëtar was a political organization that mainly fought for an Ethnic Albania and fought communist groups in alliance with the German occupation forces. During 1944 he joined the German Forces as an ally and fought the anti-nazi guerrilla groups. His cousin became the prime minister of Albania.

After World War II and death
In 1945, the communists won the war in Albania. Mid'hat escaped the communists by fleeing to southern Italy. The early years of the Cold War found Mid'hat Frashëri in the West trying to patch together a coalition of anti-communist opposition forces in Britain and the United States. In August 1949, he was elected as head of a "Free Albania" National Committee. He died of a heart attack at the Lexington Hotel on Lexington Avenue in New York and was buried in Ferncliff Cemetery in New York. His remains were reburied in Tirana in November 2018.

His cousin, Mehdi Frashëri, served as Albanian Prime Minister under a German-backed Albanian Government.

Legacy
Mid'hat Frashëri was a man of short stature with a speech impediment. He was a beloved leader and also a bibliophile. His library, one of the finest in the Balkans, became the basis for the Albanian National Library. Frashëri's entire library of some 20,000 volumes, the largest in Albania at that time, was confiscated by the new regime. The library included significant albanological works inherited from Franz Nopcsa von Felsö-Szilvás.

He was described by an Italian journalist as a man who dressed very properly with very clean white cuffs and very white hair.

Although Frashëri was one of the signers of the Albanian Declaration of Independence in 1912, the Communists, after taking over in 1945, deleted his name from the official documents.

Quotes
When Albania declared independence from the Ottoman Empire:
"Until now the Albanians have lived very little for themselves; their activity, their blood, their talents have profited their neighbors. They have consecrated their best for the good of others. Now they must live and work for themselves, for their Albania.

In regards to Albanian Communists:
"Quislings who collaborated with Tito"
He added that these 'Quislings' were no longer Albanian, that they have forgotten how to be Albanian for they no longer respect the right of hospitality.

References

1880 births
1949 deaths
19th-century Albanian historians
19th-century essayists
19th-century male writers
19th-century translators
20th-century Albanian poets
20th-century Albanian politicians
20th-century essayists
20th-century Albanian historians
20th-century translators
Politicians from Ioannina
People from Janina vilayet
Albanian anti-communists
Albanian collaborators with Nazi Germany
Signatories of the Albanian Declaration of Independence
Balli Kombëtar
Albanian Sufis
Government ministers of Albania
Public Works ministers of Albania
Bektashi Order
Albanian expatriates in Italy
Albanian expatriates in the United States
Bibliophiles
Albanian publishers (people)
Albanian essayists
Albanian male poets
French–Albanian translators
Albanian translators
Albanian-language poets
All-Albanian Congress delegates
Mid'hat
Mid'hat
Government of Durrës
Congress of Elbasan delegates
Ambassadors of Albania to France
Ambassadors of Albania to Greece
Writers from Ioannina